Sarsabz may refer to

 Sarsabz (greenery), an Urdu word for greenery.
 Sarsabz (place), a place in Tehran.